Pine Ridge was a  company town located about a mile north of Chiloquin, Oregon, along the Williamson River, run by the Forest Lumber Company from 1924 to 1939. It included a sawmill, offices, hotel, school, residences, and company store. It was destroyed by a forest fire on August 19, 1939, and never rebuilt. The office vault was the only surviving structure, and a house was later built adjacent to it, incorporating it as a room.

A sawmill was built on the site around 1915 for Modoc Lumber Company, as well as a few houses. The area was originally known as "Aspgrove."                                                                                                                                                                                                                                                                           Only the manager's house was built well; none of the others had complete bathrooms. After Forest Lumber bought the property, houses were built to a higher standard.

 Elevation:

References
 Pine Ridge: A Forgotten Town in Klamath County, Oregon, by Francis Juris (1917-2018)  
 Chicago Tribune, August 21, 1939: "Forests Ablaze over 1,000 Mile Pacific Front."

Unincorporated communities in Klamath County, Oregon
Unincorporated communities in Oregon